Edward Coke Crow (December 19, 1861 – May 9, 1945) was a United States Democratic Attorney General from the state of Missouri.



Life

He was born in Oregon, Holt County, Missouri, United States on 19 Dec 1861 and was the sixth of seven children born to Elizabeth Hopkins Barnes and George Washington Crow.

Crow attended Washington University in St. Louis, Missouri and served as an attorney for Anheuser-Busch before serving as the 23rd Attorney General of Missouri from 1897 to 1905.  He represented Jasper County, Missouri. Crow was also a friend and advisor to Missouri Governor Lloyd C. Stark, who served from 1937 to 1941.

He was a member of the Carthage Light Guard in Carthage, Missouri. It was a very highly esteemed group and was the pride of Carthage, Jasper County, Missouri. It later became the 2nd Missouri Militia. A photo of the Light Guard was published in 1881 in the Carthage Press.

Edward was married first to Mary Eichelberger, c. 1879. This marriage was later annulled. Crow later married Gustavia "Gussie" Hanna on 14 September 1890 at Marshall, Missouri. They had ten children.

Edward Coke Crow died in Los Alamitos, California.

Legacy
One of Edward Coke Crow's and Gussie Hanna Crow's children was Margaret Elizabeth Crow. Margaret Crow was born in Jasper County, Missouri. She later Married Edward Preble Shaw on 11/08/1913 in St Louis Missouri, they later moved to Los Angeles, California in October 1916.

After moving to Los Angeles, Margaret Elizabeth Crow and Edward Preble Shaw had 2 children. Their first child was named Edward Preble Shaw, Jr. who was born 07/17/1918. Their second child was Margaret Elizabeth Shaw, born 10/26/1920. While living in Los Angeles Margaret and Edward gave birth to Margaret Elizabeth Sis Shaw, who was born in Hollywood, Los Angeles on October 26, 1920.

On January 27, 1939, Elizabeth Sis Shaw married  in Yuma, Arizona, Hardesty James Mcallister, son of Reed Hardesty Mcallister (1891-1961) who founded Mcallister Cadillac in 1922 with James W. Cox, but lived in Whittier California for most of their marriage. While living in Whittier Margaret and Hardesty Mcallister gave birth to Neil Hardesty Mcallister on February 12, 1944, and Reed Edward Mcallister on September 4, 1949. Reed Sr., Elizabeth, Hardesty, Neil and Reed Mcallister successfully operated Mcallister Cadillac for over 70 years and was one of the longest family owned automobile dealership in the nation.  The McAllisters sold the dealership to Ara Sevacherian in 1994. It closed in 2009.

Neil Hardesty McAllister had two children Michael Reed McAllister, born Dec 1969 and Douglas Neil McAllister born Nov. 1972 and passed away on January 20, 2023. Michael McAllister, growing up in Virginia with Neil's ex-wife Diana "Cox" McAllister, now remarried in Virginia. Michael is in the banking industry, having roles ranging from CFO to CEO of multiple public banking institutions, Virginia Community Bank (OTCMKTS:FVCB), Virginia Company Bank (NASDQ:EVBS) as well as previously working for GMAC and McAllister Cadillac, Inc. before its sale. Michael R McAllister is Married to his high school sweetheart Ellen "Lane" McAllister, and lives in Virginia with their two children Reed McAllister and John McAllister.

Douglas McAllister is CEO of a global automotive financial technology company partnered since 2013 with Fidelity National Information Systems (NYSE: FIS), which is headquartered in Jacksonville, FL. Douglas still spends much of his time in Newport Beach, CA. Douglas N McAllister never married and has no children.

Neil's younger brother, Reed Edward Mcallister then went on to marry Ruthann Rounds on May 17, 1975, in Los Angeles, California. Reed and Ruthann Mcallister then went on to have 2 children, Chrystina Ann Mcallister born January 29, 1978, and Mathew Reed Mcallister born August 17, 1980.

References

St. Louis City-County Biographies.. St. Louis Genealogical Society. Ilene Kanfer Murray.
The History of Jasper County, Missouri, including a condensed history of the State, a complete history of Carthage and Joplin, other towns and townships.. Des Moines: Mills & Co., 1883. p. 333.
Missouri State Archives
1880 Federal Census.  Census Place Carthage, Jasper, Missouri, Family History Library Film 1254694, NA Film Number T9-0694, Page Number 443D
Census Place St. Louis, St. Louis, Missouri, Family History Library Film 1254725, NA Film Number T9-0725, St. Louis Enumeration First Enumeration, Page Number 174A.
Papers of Stark, Lloyd Crow (1886-1972), Papers, 1931-1941 (C4)
"The Book of St. Louisans: A Biographical Dictionary Of Leading Living Men Of The City Of St. Louis." edited by John W. Leonard, St. Louis: The St. Louis Republic, 1906. p. 139. 

1861 births
1945 deaths
People from Holt County, Missouri
Washington University School of Law alumni
Missouri Democrats
Missouri Attorneys General